The 2018 Vanier Cup, the 54th edition of the Canadian university football championship, took place on November 24, 2018 at Telus Stadium in Quebec City, Quebec. This game is a rematch of the 53rd Vanier Cup, with the defending champion Western Mustangs and Laval Rouge et Or making 14th and 12th appearances in the national title game overall. Both programs have not only made the most appearances in the game (ranking first and second), but they also have the most wins, with Laval having won nine Vanier Cups and Western having won seven.

This was the fifth time that Quebec City hosted the Vanier Cup and the first time since 2015.

Semi-Championships 
The Vanier Cup is played between the champions of the Mitchell Bowl and the Uteck Bowl, the national semi-final games. In 2018, according to the rotating schedule, the Canada West Hardy Trophy championship team, Saskatchewan Huskies, visited the Yates Cup Ontario championship team, the Western Mustangs for the Mitchell Bowl. The winners of the Atlantic conference's Loney Bowl, St. Francis Xavier X-Men, visited the Québec conference Dunsmore Cup championship team, Laval Rouge et Or, for the Uteck Bowl.

References

External links
 Official website

Vanier Cup
Vanier Cup
Vanier Cup
2018 in Quebec
2010s in Quebec City
Canadian football competitions in Quebec